The Redfern Waterloo Authority, formerly the Redfern-Eveleigh-Darlington Program, was an Australian Government of New South Wales authority, with responsibility for the "Urban Renewal of the Built Environment, Human Services and Employment and Enterprise in Redfern-Waterloo".

It was abolished in 2010.

References

External links

2004 establishments in Australia
Government agencies established in 2004
2010 disestablishments in Australia
Government agencies disestablished in 2010
Organisations based in Sydney